Zurück zum Glück (Pun: Back to happiness/Fortunately back) is the tenth studio album by the German punk band Die Toten Hosen. The cover is designed by Dirk Rudolph.

Track listing
 "Kopf oder Zahl" (Heads or tails; lit. Head or number) (von Holst, Frege/Frege) − 2:46
 "Wir sind der Weg" (We are the way) (Breitkopf/Frege) − 2:18
 "Ich bin die Sehnsucht in dir" (I am the longing in you) (von Holst/Frege, Weitholz) − 4:03
 "Weißes Rauschen" (White noise) (Meurer/Frege) − 2:07
 "Alles wird vorübergehen" (Everything will go by) (von Holst/Frege) − 3:11
 "Beten" (Praying) (von Holst/Frege) − 2:47
 "Wunder" (Wonders) (Breitkopf/Frege, Funny van Dannen) − 2:41
 "Herz brennt" (Heart burns) (Meurer/Frege) − 3:57
 "Zurück zum Glück" (Back to happiness) (van Dannen, Frege/Frege, van Dannen) − 2:42
 "Die Behauptung" (The statement) (von Holst/Frege) − 3:05
 "How Do You Feel?" (Breitkopf/T. V. Smith) − 3:22
 "Freunde" (Friends) (Frege, von Holst/Frege) − 4:01
 "Walkampf" (Whale struggle; a play on the word "Wahlkampf" [Election campaign]) (Frege, van Dannen/van Dannen, Frege) − 3:34
 "Goldener Westen" (Golden West) (von Holst, Frege/Frege) − 2:50
 "Am Ende" (In the end) (Meurer/Frege) − 3:19

Singles
2004: "Ich bin die Sehnsucht in dir"
2004: "Walkampf"
2005: "Alles wird vorübergehen"
2005: "Freunde"

Demos
One unreleased demo from the album surfaced in 2007 with the re-release of Auswärtsspiel.

"Das Leben ist schwer, wenn man dumm ist" (Life is hard, when one's dumb) (von Holst/Frege) – 3:39

Personnel
Campino – vocals
Andreas von Holst – guitar
Michael Breitkopf – guitar
Andreas Meurer – bass
Vom Ritchie – drums
Raphael Zweifel – cello on 10
Hans Steingen's orchestra on 10

Charts

Weekly charts

Year-end charts

References 

Die Toten Hosen albums
2004 albums
German-language albums